The Bensen House, sometimes called the 1916 House or the Grant Historical House, is a historic U.S. home located at 5795 U.S. Route 1, Grant, Florida.  The house was built in 1916 by Atley Bensen for his wife Clara.  It now serves as a house museum and the home for the Grant Historical Society.

Notes

External links
Grant Historical House

Florida cracker culture
Historic house museums in Florida
Historical society museums in Florida
Museums in Brevard County, Florida
Houses in Brevard County, Florida